Kilson is a surname. Notable people with the surname include:

Kilson (footballer) (born 1983), São Toméan footballer
Billy Kilson (born 1962), American jazz drummer
Martin Kilson (1931–2019), American political scientist

See also
Hilson
Pilson
Wilson (name)